The mayor is the highest elected official in Charleston, South Carolina.  Since the city's incorporation in 1783, Charleston's chief executive officer has been elected directly by qualified voters, except for the years 1867–1868, when mayors were appointed by Federal officials.  The position was known as intendant until 1836, and has been known as "mayor" since that time. In 2012, the annual mayoral salary was $162,815.90.

Intendants and Mayors of Charleston, South Carolina

See also
 Timeline of Charleston, South Carolina

Footnotes

Charleston